The Project Arrow is an electric vehicle developed and produced by the Canadian Automotive Parts Manufacturer's Association. It was partially presented at their annual conference on October 19, 2022.

The name Project Arrow is a reference to the Avro Canada CF-105 Arrow, a military aircraft created in Canada in the late 1950s.

Overview
The vehicle will be fully electric and equipped with an advanced self-driving system provided by Canada's automotive suppliers, more than 400 of which have expressed interest in the project. It will be revealed fully to the public at CES in January 2023.

References

Electric concept cars
Cars of Canada